Graeme Donald (born 14 April 1974) is a Scottish former footballer.

References

External links 

1974 births
Living people
Footballers from Stirling
Scottish footballers
Association football defenders
Hibernian F.C. players
Stirling Albion F.C. players
Stenhousemuir F.C. players
Scottish Football League players
Bo'ness United F.C. players
Scotland under-21 international footballers